This is a list of foreign ministers of the Dominican Republic from 1943 to the present day.

1943–1946: Manuel Arturo Peña Batlle
1946–1947: Arturo Despradel
1947–1953: Virgilio Díaz Ordóñez
1953: Rafael Trujillo
1953–1955: Joaquín Balaguer
1955–1956: 
1956–1961: 
1961–1962: Ambrosio Álvarez Aybar
1962–1963: José Antonio Bonilla Atiles
1963: Armando González Tamayo
1963: Andrés A. Freites Barrera
1963: Héctor García-Godoy
1963–1964: Donald Reid Cabral
1964: Luis Aquiles Mejía Guzmán
1964–1965: Donald Reid Cabral
1965: Horacio Vicioso Soto
1965: Jottin Cury (in opposition)
1965–1966: José Ramón Rodríguez
1966: Carlos Federico Pérez y Pérez
1966–1967: Gilberto Herrera Báez
1967–1970: Fernando Amiama Tió
1970–1972: Jaime Manuel Fernández
1972–1975: Víctor Gómez Bergés
1975–1980: Ramón Emilio Jiménez
1980–1981: Emilio Ludovino Fernández
1981–1982: Manuel Enrique Tavares Espaillat
1982: Pedro Padilla Tonos
1982–1986: José Augusto Vega Imbert
1986–1988: Donald Reid Cabral
1988–1991: Joaquín Ricardo García
1991–1994: Juan Arístides Taveras Guzmán
1994–1996: Carlos Morales Troncoso 
1996: Caonabo Javier Castillo
1996–2000: Eduardo Latorre Rodríguez
2000–2003: Hugo Tolentino Dipp
2003–2004: Frank Guerrero Prats
2004–2014: Carlos Morales Troncoso
2014–2016: Andrés Navarro
2016–2020: Miguel Vargas
2020–present: Roberto Álvarez Gil

See also
Dominican Republic
List of presidents of the Dominican Republic
Vice President of the Dominican Republic
List of colonial governors of Santo Domingo

Lists of Incumbents

Sources
Rulers.org – Foreign ministers A–D

Dominican Republic, Foreign ministers
 
Foreign relations of the Dominican Republic